Valery Dmitrievich Zorkin is the first and the current Chairman of the Constitutional Court of the Russian Federation.

Zorkin was born on 18 February 1943 in Konstantinovka, Oktyabrsky District in Primorsky Krai (Maritime Province). In 1964, he matriculated from the Law Department of the Moscow University, in which he lectured until the late 1980s. He also lectured at the Ministry of USSR Internal Affairs, and became a professor. He became recognized as a leading specialist on the legal doctrines of Boris Chicherin. During the last two years of the Soviet Union's existence, he led a group of legal experts working for the Soviet Constitutional Commission, furthering the case of shaping Russia a presidential republic. He left the CPSU after the August coup.

In October 1991, he became a judge of the Constitutional Court of Russia and on 1 November was elected the court's first (and only) chairman with unlimited tenure. During the Russian constitutional crisis of 1992-1993, Zorkin and the Constitutional Court collided with President Yeltsin on a number of issues, incl. his decision to ban the CPSU and (later) the National Salvation Front. On 30 November 1992, the court overruled Yeltsin's decision to disband the local branches of the Communist Party (the court agreed with Yeltsin that disbanding the ruling bodies of the party was lawful).

In September 1993, Zorkin was involved in the bitter dispute as to the legitimacy of Boris Yeltsin's decision to dissolve the Supreme Soviet of Russia, a decision which ran contrary to the outdated RSFSR constitution. Zorkin is often credited with having stood behind the 22 September 1993 court ruling which declared Yeltsin's decision unconstitutional. Though the ruling (passed with 9 judges in favor and 4 judges against), was in agreement with the Constitution, Yeltsin had the work of the court suspended and Zorkin was forced to resign from the position of the chairman on 6 October 1993, retaining the post of a member of the court. Namely, Sergey Filatov, the head of the president's administration, is reported  to have called the judges in the morning of 5 October, demanding Zorkin's resignation. However, eight judges out of the twelve present at the session of the court suggested that Zorkin should not resign (4 judges – N.Vitruk, E.Ametistov, T.Morshchakova and V.Oleynik – recommending Zorkin's resignation). In the evening, Filatov contacted Zorkin himself and demanded that he stepped down, otherwise a criminal case would be opened, accusing Zorkin of 'creating legal base for the extremist activities of Rutskoy and Khasbulatov'. On 6 October, Zorkin handed in his resignation from the post of chairman, which the Constitutional Court accepted. N.Vitruk was appointed as acting chairman of the Constitutional Court. On December 1, he and his fellow judge Luchin were dismissed from the Constitutional Court by 5 votes to 4 for engaging in politics. In December, he participated in a gathering of communists, nationalists and other opponents of the new constitution proposed by Yeltsin.

Zorkin was re-instated as judge on 25 January 1994. Nevertheless, in March, 1994, Zorkin signed the declaration of the orgkomitet of 'Concord in the Name of Russia' (Согласие во имя России), together with Gennady Zyuganov, Alexander Rutskoy, Alexander Prokhanov, Sergey Glazyev, Stanislav Govorukhin, Aman Tuleyev et al. Despite having written the main report for the conference, he refrained from the foundation of the Concord, as he was warned again by the Court for political activities.

Zorkin then stopped his political activities. No longer a chairman, he reportedly happened to disagree with the majority's decision more often than did other judges of the court, such as, in 1995, voicing dissent over the court's ruling that the President's and Prime Minister's decision to move Russian troops into Chechnya was legitimate.

Ten years after the court's decision that made him famous, on 24 February 2003, he was reelected the court's chairman. Many observers viewed his return to the office as corroborating the validity of the court's appraisal of Yeltsin's actions in 1993.

Controversially, Zorkin praised serfdom in an article for Rossiyskaya Gazeta in 2014. Zorkin claimed that serfdom had united Russia and compared its abolishment to Yeltsin's reforms in the 1990s.

Sanctions
In December 2022 the EU sanctioned Valery Zorkin in relation to the 2022 Russian invasion of Ukraine.

Honours and awards
 Order of Merit for the Fatherland;
2nd class (19 October 2011) – for outstanding contribution to strengthening the constitutional foundations of Russian statehood and constitutional development
3rd class (18 February 2008) – for his great contribution to the development of constitutional justice in the Russian Federation and many years of fruitful activity
 Honoured Lawyer of Russia (23 March 2000) – for services to strengthen the rule of law and many years of honest work
 Diploma of the President of Russia (12 December 2008) – for active participation in the drafting of the Constitution and a great contribution to the democratic foundations of the Russian Federation
 Order of Friendship (Armenia) (2016)

References

External links

The Moscow Times: Zorkin Says Courts Must Check Kremlin's Power
"Authoritarian constitutionalism in Putin's Russia: A pragmatic constitutional court in a dual state"

Judges of the Constitutional Court of Russia
Russian politicians
Russian legal scholars
Living people
People from Primorsky Krai
Full Cavaliers of the Order "For Merit to the Fatherland"
1943 births